Donald or Don Davis may refer to:

Entertainment
 Donald Davis (writer) (1904–1992), American playwright and screenwriter
 Don Marion Davis (1917–2020), American child actor
 Donald Davis (actor) (1928–1998), Canadian actor and theatre director
 Don Davis (record producer) (1938–2014), for Motown and Stax
 Donald A. Davis (born 1939), writer of military histories and military thrillers
 Don S. Davis (1942–2008), actor known for his roles in Stargate SG-1 and Twin Peaks
 Donald Davis (storyteller) (born 1944), American storyteller
 Don Davis (artist) (born 1952), astronomer known for his painting of space
 Don Davis (composer) (born 1957), known for his scores for films such as The Matrix trilogy
 Donald E. Davis, author and historian
 Don Davis, a pen-name of Brett Halliday

Politics
 Donald Watson Davis (1849–1906), politician from Northwest Territories, Canada
 Donald M. Davis (1915–1976), Pennsylvania politician
 Don Davis (Florida politician) (1931–2008), Republican from Jacksonville, Florida
 Donald G. Davis (born 1971), North Carolina politician

Sports
 Don Davis (racing driver) (1933–1962), American race car driver
 Donnie Davis (American football end) (1940–2004)
 Don Davis (defensive tackle) (born 1943), American football player
 Don Davis (linebacker) (born 1972), American football player
 Donnie Davis (born 1972), American quarterback in college and arena football
 Don Davis (Gaelic footballer) (born 1969), Irish

Other
 Donald C. Davis (1921–1998), admiral in the United States Navy
 Donald J. Davis (1929–2007), bishop of Erie
 Donald W. Davis (1921–2010), American businessman
 Don Davis (gun retailer) (1933–2016), gun store owner and former Brady bill supporter turned critic
 Donald R. Davis (entomologist) (born 1934), American entomologist
 Donald R. Davis (astronomer), American astronomer
 Donald R. Davis (economist), American economist

See also 
 Donald Davies (disambiguation)